Bert Harris is a footballer who played as a goalkeeper in the Football League for Everton, Tranmere Rovers and Southport.

References

1931 births
Living people
Sportspeople from Bootle
Association football goalkeepers
English footballers
Maghull F.C. players
Everton F.C. players
Tranmere Rovers F.C. players
Southport F.C. players
English Football League players
Knowsley United F.C. players